Yarmouth Consolidated Memorial High School (YCMHS) is a secondary school located in Yarmouth, Nova Scotia, Canada. It is part of the Tri-County Regional School Board and is the only high school in the town of Yarmouth. The high school serves the town of Yarmouth as well as the rest of Yarmouth County.

History 
At a public meeting held in the evening of July 26, 1898, the building was purchased for $8000 by the School Commission to be used as the Yarmouth County Academy. It is a memorial school dedicated to the war dead of Yarmouth Town and County during the First and Second World Wars. On February 20, 1949, the academy was totally destroyed by fire. As the news spread, many students, new and old, gathered in horror to watch it burn to the ground. The fire lead way for a new high school which was built in 1951. In September 2012, the new high school on Forest Street opened to replace the aging 1951 building.

Notable alumni 
Brian Borcherdt, alternative country artist
Ryan Cook, country music artist
Jocelyne Couture-Nowak, victim of the Virginia Tech Massacre
David Morse, politician
Jody Shelley, National Hockey League Player
Zach Churchill, MLA for Yarmouth, NS Minister of Education

References

External links
Yarmouth Consolidated Memorial High School
Tri-County Regional School Board

High schools in Nova Scotia
Schools in Yarmouth County
Yarmouth, Nova Scotia
International Baccalaureate schools in Nova Scotia